Lilleshall and Donnington is a civil parish in the borough of Telford and Wrekin, Shropshire, England.  It contains 34 listed buildings that are recorded in the National Heritage List for England.  Of these, three are listed at Grade I, the highest of the three grades, and the others are at Grade II, the lowest grade.  The parish contains the village of Lilleshall and the surrounding countryside, the village of Muxton, and Donnington, a ward. Most of the listed buildings are houses and associated structures, farmhouses and farm buildings, a high proportion of which are timber framed and date from the 16th and 17th centuries.  The other listed buildings include the ruins of an abbey and its garden wall, two churches, and a monument.


Key

Buildings

References

Citations

Sources

Lists of buildings and structures in Shropshire